Fatty's Jonah Day is a 1914 American short comedy film directed by and starring Fatty Arbuckle.

Cast
 Roscoe 'Fatty' Arbuckle 
 Edward Dillon - (as Eddie Dillon)
 Frank Hayes
 Norma Nichols
 Ted Edwards - Cop (uncredited)

See also
 List of American films of 1914
 Fatty Arbuckle filmography

References

External links

1914 films
Films directed by Roscoe Arbuckle
1914 comedy films
1914 short films
American silent short films
American black-and-white films
Silent American comedy films
American comedy short films
1910s American films
1910s English-language films